Nick Gold is a British record producer, multi-instrumentalist and music executive. He is the CEO of World Circuit Records and the organiser of Buena Vista Social Club, a Cuban musical ensemble which he established in 1996. Gold is a two time Grammy Award winner. In 2006, The New York Times described him as a "Musical Matchmaker".

Biography 
Gold graduated from the University of Sussex with a degree in African history, his father was a TV producer, prior his graduation he started his career working in a jazz record store in London where he discovered about Arts Worldwide, an organization ran by Anne Hunt and Mary Farquharson that puts up British concerts tours for musicians from Latin America and Africa. The organization would go on and created a record company to produce recordings after high demand from audiences who wanted records. Preceding the creation of the label, the organization hired Gold as the pantologist of the label and was given first appointment to find a recording studio and a producer for Kenyan musical group, Shiratti Jazz. According to the New York Times, that was his first time in a recording studio and the first time he saw a mixing console.

Around early 90s, Gold bought the organization and took over. Prior that, Gold invited American musician Ry Cooder and Malian singer Ali Farka Touré in london where they passed a guitar to and fro and came to an agreement to work together in the future. In 1996, he intended to bring two Malian guitarists to Cuba for sessions with Ry Cooder and a group of Cuban musicians, as an inspection in Afro-Cubanism but the guitarists didn't make it to Cuba because they were not given visas. Gold would go on and concregated more Cubans of varying ages and performing styles and founded Beauna Vista Social Club.

Gold produced 1984 Grammy award-winning studio album by Ali Farka Touré, Cherie, he co-produced Buena Vista Social Club's 1996 debut studio album Buena Vista Social Club. Gold is also noted for his production, engineering and coordination credits on Toumani Diabaté, London Symphony Orchestra, Afro-Cuban All Stars, Afel Bocoum, Tony Allen, Orchestra Baobab, Djeli Moussa Diawara, Fatoumata Diawara, Cheikh Lô, Oumou Sangaré and Hugh Masekela.

In 2018, Gold sold World Circuit Records to Bertelsmann Music Group, according to BillBoard, in a multimillion-dollar deal under the terms of the possession that he will continue to lead the label with a small production team within the label, and support with marketing and promotion departments.

References

External links 

 Nick Gold Credits at AllMusic

Living people
British record producers
Music industry executives